Taugourdeau is a French surname. Notable people with the surname include:

Jean-Charles Taugourdeau (born 1953), French politician
Anthony Taugourdeau (born 1989), French footballer

French-language surnames